Allen Pond Outlet flows into the South Branch Grass River near Clarksboro, New York.

References 

Rivers of New York (state)